The 1998 Rushmoor Council election took place on 7 May 1998 to elect members of Rushmoor Borough Council in Hampshire, England. One third of the council was up for election and the council stayed under no overall control.

After the election, the composition of the council was
Conservative 17
Labour 14
Liberal Democrat 14

Election result

References

1998
1998 English local elections
1990s in Hampshire